Aiden Joseph Cairns (1917-1992)  was a professional rugby league footballer in the Australian competition,  the New South Wales Rugby Football League premiership.

Playing career
A three-quarter, Cairns, played in 17 matches for the Eastern Suburbs in 1938 and 23 for the North Sydney club in 1941,1942 and 1944. In the 1938 season, Cairns was a try scorer in the Eastern Suburbs side that was defeated by Canterbury in that year's premiership final.

Death
He died on 15 January 1992 in Brisbane, Queensland and was cremated at Mt. Thompson Memorial Gardens.

References

Sources
 The Encyclopedia Of Rugby League; Alan Whiticker & Glen Hudson

Australian rugby league players
Sydney Roosters players
Rugby league wingers
Rugby league centres
1992 deaths
1917 births
Place of birth missing